Margaret Gallagher is an Irish freelance researcher and writer specialising in gender and media. She has carried out research, development and evaluation projects for the United Nations Statistics Division, UNIFEM, UNESCO, the International Labour Office, the Council of Europe, the European Commission and the European Audiovisual Observatory.

Gallagher sits on the editorial boards of International Communication Gazette, Feminist Media Studies and, Communication for Development and Social Change.

Education
Gallagher gained a M.Sc. in education from the University of Dayton in 1972, and her Ed.D. in 1978 from Western Michigan University.

Career
Gallagher began her career, in the 1970s, researching the use of technology in education, eventually becoming deputy head of the Audiovisual Media Research Group at the Open University. She moved into gender and media research, including participation rates and portrayal of women in the media, in the early 1980s.

In 1986 Gallagher established the European Commission's Steering Committee for Equal Opportunities in Broadcasting, which she coordinated until 1990. From 1989 to 1999 she worked on the "Prix Niki", the European Commission's biennial television prize for innovative portrayal of women and men. She has also acted as a consultant to a consortium of five European broadcasters for the development of an audiovisual training kit Screening Gender (1997-2000), and to the World Association for Christian Communication (WAAC) for the second Global Media Monitoring Project (GMMP) (2000).

In 2001, Gallagher became an associate of the Women's Institute for Freedom of the Press (WIFP).

Gallagher is currently Key Expert on Media Monitoring for the European Neighbourhood Barometer project "Opinion Polling and Media Monitoring" (EuropeAid, European Commission).

Bibliography

Books
 
  Social sciences: Mass communication and society course DE353, units 10-12.
  Social sciences: Mass communication and society course DE353, units 10-12.
  ProQuest.
 
  ProQuest.
 
  Preview.
  Pdf.
  Pdf.

Chapters in books
  Pdf.
 
 Also available at:

Journal articles
 
 
 
 
 
 
 
  Pdf. Report from the Copenhagen Conference on Women and Electronic Mass Media.

Papers
UNESCO / UN
  Pdf.
  Pdf. Discussion document for the International Commission for the Study of Communication (established by UNESCO) in application of Resolution 100 adopted by the General Conference of UNESCO at its 19th session.
 
  Pdf.
  Pdf.
  Pdf.
  Pdf.
  Pdf. (Reports and papers on mass communication, no 110.)
 
 
Open University
  (IET paper on broadcasting no. 23.)
  (IET paper on broadcasting no. 35.)
  (IET paper on broadcasting no 40.)
  Pdf. (Audio-Visual Media Research Group.)
  Pdf. (IET paper on broadcasting no 41.)
  Pdf. (Audio-Visual Media Research Group.)
  Pdf. (Audio-Visual Media Research Group.)
  Pdf. (Audio-Visual Media Research Group with Faculty of Mathematics.)
  (IET paper on broadcasting no 55.)
  (IET paper on broadcasting no 59.)
  (IET paper on broadcasting no 62.)
  (IET paper on broadcasting no 63.)
  (IET paper on broadcasting no 77.)
  (IET paper on broadcasting no 80.)
  (IET paper on broadcasting no 86.)
  (IET paper on broadcasting no 96.)
  (IET paper on broadcasting no 88.)
  (IET paper on broadcasting no 91.)
  Seminar and conference reports (Council for Educational Technology for the United Kingdom), 3. (IET paper on broadcasting no 100.)
  (IET paper on broadcasting no 102.)
  (IET paper on broadcasting no 127.)
  (IET paper on broadcasting no. 42.)
Europe
 
 
 
  (Paper ref CE-10-97-122-EN-C) Free pdf of entire paper.
 
Other
  Paper presented at the Conference of the International Association of Mass Communication Researchers, Paris, 6–10 September 1982.
  Paper presented to the 1st plenary session of the 1984 conference.
  Paper presented at the annual meeting of the International Communication Association, Honolulu.

References

External links
 Margaret Gallagher Mapping Global Media Policy
 Advisors: Margaret Gallagher European Communication Research and Education Association (ECREA)

Academics of the Open University
Gender studies academics
Living people
Mass media scholars
Mass media theorists
University of Dayton alumni
Western Michigan University alumni
Irish women writers
Irish non-fiction writers
Irish women non-fiction writers
Year of birth missing (living people)